Salvador García-Bodaño (17 July 1935 – 7 March 2023) was a Spanish poet. He was a member of the Royal Galician Academy from 1992 until his death.

Awards and honors 

 Premio de Poesía Gallega y Poesía Castellana en las Festas Minervais (1959)
 Premio de la Crítica de poesía gallega por Tempo de Compostela (1978)
 Premio de la Junta de Galicia a la Creación Cultural (1988)
 Premio de la Crítica de narrativa gallega por Os misterios de Monsieur D´Aillier (1992)
 Premio O Escritor na súa Terra de AELG (2004)
 Premio Cultura Galega das Letras (2012) 
 Insignia de Ouro de la Universidad de Santiago de Compostela (2012)
 Premio Voz da Liberdade de PEN Clube de Galicia (2013)
 Medalla de ouro e título de Fillo adoptivo de Santiago de Compostela (2014). Además, la municipalidad de Santiago le dedicó una plaza en el barrio de San Lázaro.

References 

1935 births
2023 deaths
20th-century Spanish poets
21st-century Spanish poets
University of Santiago de Compostela alumni
University of Oviedo alumni
People from Vigo (comarca)